Narcopolis may refer to:
 Narcopolis, a 2008 four-issue miniseries comic by Jamie Delano and Jeremy Rock.
 Narcopolis (book), a 2012 Indian novel
 Narcopolis (film), a 2015 British film